The Jamaica men's national tennis team represents Jamaica in Davis Cup tennis competition and are governed by Tennis Jamaica.

Jamaica currently compete in the Americas Zone of Group III.  They reached the semifinals of Group II in 1988.

History
Jamaica competed in its first Davis Cup in 1988.

Current team (2022) 

 Blaise Bicknell
 Rowland Phillips
 John Chin
 Jacob Bicknell
 Daniel Azar (Junior player)

Recent performances
Here is the list of all match-ups since 1988, when the Jamaican Davis Cup team debuted.

1980s

1990s

2000s

2010s

See also
Davis Cup
Jamaica Fed Cup team

External links

Davis Cup teams
Davis Cup
Davis Cup